The Kneeland Elementary School District, headquartered in Kneeland, California, oversees public education, through grade 8, in a portion of east central Humboldt County, California.  The school it operates is a two-room K-8 school in Kneeland.

The school board consists of three members:
Michelle Krupa - President 
Steve Schmalz
Seth Lancaster

The superintendent is Carole Boshears.

References

External links
 

School districts in Humboldt County, California